Nanwalek Airport  is a state-owned public-use airport located in Nanwalek (formerly English Bay), an unincorporated community in the Kenai Peninsula Borough of the US state of Alaska. It was formerly known as English Bay Airport.

Facilities and aircraft 

For 12-month period ending December 31, 2002, the airport had 3,100 aircraft operations, an average of 8 per day: 97% air taxi and 3% general aviation.

Airlines and destinations 

This airport is considered the shortest runway in the USA used by US commuter airlines. The runway is 1850 feet, however the Department of Transportation has closed the first 1000 feet of Runway 19 making the usable runway only 850 feet.

Incidents
A Cessna 206 belonging to Smokey Bay Air crashed near the Nanwalek Airport, after an aborted landing, on July 11, 2003. The plane crashed into the sea about 200 yards offshore. The pilot, Stephen Finley, 49 of Hopewell, N.J. died in the crash. He was the only person on board. 

A Cessna 206 belonging to Smokey Bay Air crashed near Nanwalek Airport on takeoff on December 15, 2011. The plane crashed into the sea about 100 ft (30 m) from the shore, and the four persons who had been on board swam to the shore. The crash is being investigated by the National Transportation Safety Board.

Nanwalek Airport in Popular Culture 

Games 
 Nanwalek Airport is featured as a hand crafted Airport in Microsoft Flight Simulator (2020 video game).

References

External links 
 FAA Alaska airport diagram (GIF)
 Resources for this airport:
 
 
 

Airports in Kenai Peninsula Borough, Alaska